William H. Thompson may refer to:

 William Hepworth Thompson (1810–1886), English classical scholar and Master of Trinity College, Cambridge
William Henry Thompson (1853–1937), U.S. senator from Nebraska
William Howard Thompson (1871–1928), U.S. senator from Kansas
William Hale Thompson (1868–1944), mayor of Chicago
William Harvey Thompson, prohibition enforcement agent in the Seattle, Washington
 William H. Thompson (actor) (1852–1923), Scottish-born actor

See also
 William Thompson (disambiguation)